The following is a list of for-profit colleges and universities in Pennsylvania.  Only schools with a physical campus within the state are listed. For public and private, not-for-profit schools, see List of colleges and universities in Pennsylvania.

Colleges
Pennsylvania